Aredius of Gap (Arigius, Arey) (c. 575, Chalon-sur-Saône – c. 605) was bishop of Gap.

He is a Catholic and Orthodox saint, with feast day May 1.

Notes

External links

 www.katolsk.no

575 births
605 deaths
People from Chalon-sur-Saône
Bishops of Gap
7th-century Frankish bishops
7th-century Frankish saints